Jim Walker (born c. 1944) is a former American football player and coach. He served as the head football coach at Western New Mexico University from 1976 to 1977.

He played college football at Texas Tech University in the early 1960s.

References

1944 births
Living people
American football defensive backs
American football fullbacks
Texas Tech Red Raiders football players
Western New Mexico Mustangs football coaches